Parkway Bank Sports Complex, also known as the Ballpark at Rosemont, is an outdoor baseball park used for fastpitch softball and baseball located in the American city of Rosemont, Illinois, a suburb of Chicago. It hosted the National Pro Fastpitch Women's Softball team Chicago Bandits. It is located neighboring the Rosemont Dome, and is near Allstate Arena and newly constructed Impact Field, a larger ballpark used by the Chicago Dogs professional baseball team. The stadium opened in 2011 and has a seating capacity of 2,000.

References

Rosemont, Illinois
Baseball venues in Illinois
Roosevelt Lakers
Softball venues in Illinois
Sports venues completed in 2011
Sports venues in Cook County, Illinois
College softball venues in the United States
2011 establishments in Illinois